Abdul Majid Jahangir (1949 – 10 January 2023)  was a Pakistani comic actor. He was best known for his comedy roles and caricatures acted in PTV's show Fifty-Fifty.

Life and career
Majid Jahngir was born in Karachi. His father was from Punjab and his mother from Hyderabad Deccan.

Jahangir started his acting career in Moin Akhtar's show Saat Rang which was aired on PTV. In 1979, he starred in PTV's comedy show Fifty Fifty along with Ismail Tara, Zeba Shehnaz, Bushra Ansari, and Ashraf Khan. The show became popular across the country, and so did the cast. Majid remained in the lead cast of the show until it stopped airing in 1985. Then, Majid moved to the United States and lived there for the next 23 years. On returning to Pakistan, he resumed his career by participating in Aamir Liaquat Hussain's shows for Geo TV and in the comedy show Khabarnaak.

Jahangir performed in more than 35 stage shows and in 4 Urdu films during his career spanning over two decades.

Television shows

Personal life and death
Jahangir's wife Saba Majid died in 2020. Since 2016, he had been suffering from partial paralysis and other critical health issues accompanied by severe financial problems.

Jahangir died in Lahore, Pakistan on 10 January 2023.

Awards and recognition

References

20th-century births
1949 births
2023 deaths
Pakistani male comedians
Pakistani male television actors
People from Karachi
Recipients of the Pride of Performance
Recipients of Tamgha-e-Imtiaz
Pakistani people of Hyderabadi descent